Dark Mind, Dark Heart is an anthology of horror stories edited by American writer August Derleth. It was released in 1962 by Arkham House in an edition of 2,493 copies.  The anthology was conceived as a collection of new stories by old Arkham House authors.  The anthology is also notable for including the first Cthulhu Mythos story by Ramsey Campbell.

Contents

Dark Mind, Dark Heart contains the following tales:

 "Foreword", by August Derleth
"Under the Horns", by Robert Bloch
"Come Back, Uncle Ben!", by Joseph Payne Brennan
"The Church in High Street", by J. Ramsey Campbell
"Hargraves' Fore-Edge Book", by Mary Elizabeth Counselman
"Miss Esperson", by Stephen Grendon
 "The Habitants of Middle Islet", by William Hope Hodgson
 "The Grey God Passes", by Robert E. Howard
 "The Aquarium", by Carl Jacobi
 "The Man Who Wanted to Be in the Movies", by John Jakes
 "In Memoriam", by David H. Keller
 "Witches' Hollow", by H. P. Lovecraft and August Derleth
 "The Ideal Type", by Frank Mace
 "The Firing Chamber", by John Metcalfe
 "The Green Vase", by Dennis Roidt
 "Xélucha", by M. P. Shiel
 "The Animals in the Case", by H. Russell Wakefield
 "Caer Sidhi", by George Wetzel

Sources

1962 anthologies
Fantasy anthologies
Horror anthologies